Aipysurus tenuis, also known as the Arafura sea snake, Mjoberg's sea snake or brown-lined sea snake, is a species of venomous snake in the family Elapidae that is native to Australia. The specific epithet tenuis (“slender”) refers to the snake's appearance.

Description
The species grows to an average of about 130 cm in length. It is long and slim, with a small brown head and a pale body.

Behaviour
The species is viviparous.

Distribution
The snake is found in marine waters off the north-west coast of Western Australia, from near Dampier to Broome, and in the Arafura Sea. The type locality is Cape Jaubert, near Broome.

References

 
tenuis
Snakes of Australia
Taxa named by Einar Lönnberg
Taxa named by Lars Gabriel Andersson
Reptiles described in 1913